Frank Randall "Randy" Farmer (born October 16, 1961) is an American game developer, co-creator with Chip Morningstar of one of the first graphical online games, 1985's Habitat. In 2001 he and Morningstar were the first recipients of the Pioneer Award (at the time called the "First Penguin Award") by the International Game Developers Association. Farmer was involved with the creation of Yahoo! 360 and Communities.com, and has published several works on web and game development, social media, and online communities.

Biography
Farmer was born in New Jersey to Frank and Katherine Farmer, and grew up in Michigan. His interest in computers began as a teenager in 1974, as his Junior High School had access to a teletype. He played an early Star Trek game, Mike Mayfield's STTR1, and learned that he could add modifications to it. He began writing his own games at Henry Ford II High School in 1976, and then COMUNI, an early Bulletin board system.

In 1984, Farmer began working at Lucasfilm Games, on an Apple II version of Koronis Rift. It was at Lucasfilm that he met Chip Morningstar, who was beginning design on the Habitat project, a groundbreaking graphical multiplayer adventure game. When the project received funding, Morningstar hired Farmer for the team, along with others such as Aric Wilmunder, Janet Hunter, Noah Falstein and Ron Gilbert.

After Lucasfilm, Farmer worked at the American Information Exchange on smart contracts, and  founded Communities.com, where he remained from 1993–2001. In 2003 he served as Community Strategy Analyst for Yahoo!, co-designing Yahoo! 360°.  From 2009–2011 he was involved with Social Media Strategy Consulting for Answers.com, and in 2011 he founded his own company, Suddenly Social, to provide platform services for social and mobile games. In 2013 he began co-hosting the Social Media Clarity Podcast with Scott Moore and Marc Smith. He was a social media consultant for Rosenfeld Media for 2014-2018.

Farmer was announced as the Executive Director of the Spritely Institute in 2022. The Institute describes itself as "a 501(c)(3) nonprofit public benefit corporation attempting to re-decentralize community on the internet."

Awards 

In March 2001, Farmer and Morningstar were awarded the inaugural "First Penguin Award" (later renamed to Pioneer Award) by the International Game Developers Association for their work on Habitat. In 1995, they were named as Tomorrow Makers by NetGuide magazine.

Selected works
Articles
 
 Farmer, Randall; Morningstar, Chip (1990). "The Lessons of Lucasfilm's Habitat", presented at the First International Conference on Cyberspace (UT Austin, May 1990).  Published in Cyberspace: First Steps, Michael Benedikt (ed.), MIT Press 1991.  .
 

Blogs
 Habitat Chronicles, the blog of Randy Farmer and Chip Morningstar.
 Building Reputation blog and wiki

Book chapters
 

 

 

Books

References

External links
 Randy Farmer at MobyGames

Living people
American non-fiction writers
American video game designers
MUD developers
People from the San Francisco Bay Area
Metaplace
1961 births
Lucasfilm people
Male non-fiction writers